Imperial Studios were the studios of the British and Dominions Film Corporation, a short-lived British film production company located at Imperial Place, Elstree Way, Borehamwood, Hertfordshire. The studios (one of several facilities historically referred to as Elstree Studios) were active from 1929 to 1936, when they were destroyed by fire.

The company relocated to Pinewood Studios but ceased production in 1938.

History
British and Dominions was one of the successors to British National Pictures, which began operations in 1925 and was taken over by British International Pictures in 1927. The British and Dominions Film Corporation was formed in June 1927 by Herbert Wilcox and was registered as a public company on 13 February 1928. As it had no studios of its own, its first films, which were silent, were made at Cricklewood Studios. In 1930, the company, which had been incorporated for the purpose of physically producing sound films, bought three new sound stages from British International at Borehamwood before their construction was completed. The new Imperial Studio  was the first purpose-built sound studio in Europe. Blackmail (1929), directed by Alfred Hitchcock and the first British talkie, had been made at the facility before British and Dominions took it over.

Filmmakers who worked for British and Dominions included producer Anthony Havelock-Allan, who made Lancashire Luck (1937) there. Alexander Korda's London Films produced The Private Life of Henry VIII, which featured an Oscar-winning performance by Charles Laughton, at Imperial Studios. The film's success in the United States and elsewhere persuaded United Artists and The Prudential to invest in Korda's proposed Denham Film Studios.

The studio was destroyed by a fire on 9 February 1936, which also destroyed three of the nine stages at the adjacent British International Studios. British and Dominions made a substantial investment in Pinewood Studios, Iver Heath, Buckinghamshire, and moved production there, including  the Herbert Wilcox production London Melody (1937) which was in production at the time of the fire. The company's last film was released in January 1938.

The support buildings at Borehamwood that remained after the fire were sold off to various companies including Frank Landsdown Ltd, which opened a film vault service. The Rank Organisation bought the music stage for the production of documentary films. It later became the headquarters of the film and sound-effect library, Cinesound Effects Library Ltd. In 1996, a plaque was placed at the location of the former studio.

Films shot at Imperial Studios

Produced by British and Dominions

Produced by other companies
Other companies used British and Dominions' studios to shoot the following films.

See also
 Associated British Picture Corporation
 List of British and Dominions films
 :Category:Films shot at Imperial Studios, Elstree
 :Category:British and Dominions Studios films
 Lists of productions shot at the other Elstree studios:
 List of films and television shows shot at Elstree Studios
 List of films and television shows shot at Clarendon Road Studios
 
 List of films shot at MGM-British Studios, Elstree

References

British film studios
Film production companies of the United Kingdom
Defunct companies of England
Mass media companies established in 1929
Mass media companies disestablished in 1936
Borehamwood
1936 fires in the United Kingdom
History of Hertfordshire
1929 establishments in the United Kingdom
1936 disestablishments in the United Kingdom
Demolished buildings and structures in England
Buildings and structures in Hertfordshire